Ellerbeck Colliery was a coal mine located on the border of Coppull and Adlington in the Borough of Chorley in Lancashire, England. The Hilton House and Red Moss Coal Company sank the first shaft in 1876 and the colliery closed in 1928.

In 1896 Ellerbeck employed 460 underground workers and 148 on the surface. In 1923 Ellerbeck Nos. 1 & 2 pits had expanded to employ 892 underground workers and 156 on the surface. Ten years later the colliery was owned by the Blackrod Colliery Company and the pit employed 50 underground and 22 surface workers mining the Bone, Wigan Six Feet and New coal seams. The colliery was nationalised in 1947 becoming part of the National Coal Board and was redeveloped employing 411 men in 1958 before finally closing in 1965.

The colliery was served by a branch line of the Lancashire Union Railway, remnants of which including the old bridge foundations on the Leeds-Liverpool Canal are evident today. The branch line was shared with neighbouring Duxbury Park Colliery.

See also
Glossary of coal mining terminology

References

Bibliography

Coal mines in Lancashire
Buildings and structures in the Borough of Chorley